CF Atlètic Amèrica is an Andorran football club. The club currently plays in Segona Divisió.

References

External links 
CF Atlètic Amèrica at faf.ad
facebook

Football clubs in Andorra